Micheal Henry Alloysius (born 31 January 1991), also known as Micheal Falcon, is a Nigerian footballer who plays as a center-back for Brunei Super League club Indera. He previously played for Magwe FC and Hanthawaddy United of the Myanmar National League.

Career
Henry started his career in Moldova for FC Rapid Ghidighici, then for Sitra Club in Bahrain, playing in their first division for the 2013–14 season. He transferred to Magwe F.C. in the 2015 Myanmar National League season, finishing third in the league table.

Then sometimes known as Micheal Falcon, Henry once again excelled in the 2016 season, repeating Magwe's league position in the previous year. He won the General Aung San Shield of that year, scoring the equalising goal in the 2–1 victory against Yangon United in the shield final. This enabled Henry's club to participate in the 2017 AFC Cup, meeting Malaysian giants and former AFC Cup winners Johor Darul Ta'zim in the group stages.

Henry moved to Hantharwady United at the start of the 2018 season, scoring on his debut in a 2–1 loss to Yangon United. He was ever-present in two seasons with the club, before transferring to Bruneian outfit Indera SC along with fellow Nigerians Emmanuel Samson and Kingsley Nkurumeh in early 2020. Henry stayed in Brunei even after the cancellation of the 2020 season of the Brunei Super League and signed for another year.

Henry scored his first goal for Indera in a 10–0 victory over Rimba Star FC on 27 June 2021.

Honours
Magwe
General Aung San Shield: 2016

Personal life
Henry converted to Islam in January 2022. He married a Bruneian local later in the year.

References

External links

1991 births
Living people
Association football defenders
Converts to Islam
Nigerian footballers
Nigerian expatriate footballers
Nigerian expatriate sportspeople in Brunei
Expatriate footballers in Moldova
Expatriate footballers in Bahrain
Expatriate footballers in Myanmar
Expatriate footballers in Brunei
Sitra Club players
FC Rapid Ghidighici players
Magway FC players
Hanthawaddy United F.C. players
Indera SC players
Myanmar National League players
Sportspeople from Onitsha